The Grove, Highgate, N6 is a short tree-lined street in north London, running north from Highgate West Hill to Hampstead Lane, known for the notable residents who have lived there over several centuries.

Early development

The line of The Grove follows the eastern boundary of an estate which at the beginning of the 17th century belonged to Warner family, several members of which held prominent positions in the City of London. The Estate's Tudor mansion was Dorchester House, described in 1620 as The Blewhouse, which stood in what is now the courtyard of Witanhurst, the palatial mansion on Highgate West Hill whose entrance marks the southern end of The Grove. Dorchester House came into the possession of William Blake in the mid 17th century, who in 1688 built numbers 1 to 6 The Grove in the part of its garden nearer the house, having earlier leased an acre at the rear of the garden on which Sir Francis Pemberton built  Grove House a decade earlier. This house was later demolished to make way for the remainder of the houses on the west side of the street, numbers 7 to 13, built from the early 19th century onwards.

The old village green, and one of its three ponds, occupied most of the east side of the street until 1844, when the New River Company acquired the land for a covered reservoir to supply the Village with piped water for the first time. South of the covered reservoir small remnants of the village green survive, whilst on the north east side of the street there are two modest apartment buildings, Old Well House and Fitzroy Lodge.

All the buildings in The Grove are Listed, either Grade II or II*, apart from numbers 12 and 13 which were built in 2015 and Old Well House, built in the early 20th century.

Notable former residents
No.1: Publisher Neville Pearson and his wife, actress Gladys Cooper

No.2: Violinist Yehudi Menuhin; musician Sting and his wife, actress Trudie Styler

No.3: Poet Samuel Taylor Coleridge; playwright J. B. Priestley; model Kate Moss

No.4: Executive Cob Stenham and daughters, the eldest of whom is playwright Polly Stenham; TV chef, restaurateur, and cookbook author, Jamie Oliver

No.5: Appeal judge Sir Edward Fry and children: artist Roger, social reformer Joan, illustrator Agnes and prison reformer Margery; musician George Michael

No.6: Musician Annie Lennox and her then-husband, film producer Uri Fruchtmann

No.7: Manager of the Marine Insurance Co., Robert John Lodge, who was also treasurer of the Highgate Literary and Scientific Institution (1880-1893)

No.8: Actors Robert Donat and Renée Asherson

No.9: Spy Anthony Blunt; industrialist John Sutton Nettlefold

Gallery

References

Citations

Sources 

 
 

Listed buildings in the London Borough of Camden
History of the London Borough of Camden
Streets in the London Borough of Camden
Highgate